Delena cancerides, the communal huntsman, flat huntsman or social huntsman, is a large, brown huntsman spider native to Australia. It has been introduced to New Zealand, where it is sometimes known as the Avondale spider. This was the species used in the Australian movie Napoleon and widely in Arachnophobia, and all films depict them as having a deadly venomous bite, but they are generally considered harmless to humans in real-life. It was first described by Charles Athanase Walckenaer in 1837.

Behavior

Highly unusual among spiders, the flat huntsman spider is a social species, even sharing prey. They are often found under loose bark (their flat shape is an adaptation for this) in colonies up to 300, but they are highly aggressive and commonly cannibalistic toward members from other colonies. They hunt their food rather than spin webs for it. They are timid towards humans and bites are infrequent, and when they occur, symptoms are usually very minor.

Distribution

The species is found all over Australia, including Tasmania. It was introduced to New Zealand in 1924. Its range in New Zealand expanded slowly out of Avondale, a suburb of Auckland, hence the alternative New Zealand common name. There is a sculpture in the Avondale shopping centre celebrating the spider.

Appearance and genetics
The body is light brown and covered in dense, fine hairs.

Various populations show major differences in the chromosomes, leading to the recognition of several "chromosomal subspecies", but these hybridize where in contact and there is little genetic divergence.

References

External links

 Avondale spider on the website of the Museum of New Zealand Te Papa Tongarewa

Sparassidae
Spiders of Australia
Spiders of New Zealand
Spiders described in 1837